Hilbrand is both a given name and a surname. Notable people with the name include:

Hilbrand Boschma (1893–1976), Dutch zoologist and museum curator
Hilbrand J. Groenewold (1910–1996), Dutch theoretical physicist
Hilbrand Nawijn (born 1948), Dutch politician
Sophie Hilbrand (born 1975), Dutch actress, television host and radio host

See also
Hillebrand